TUTO Hockey  (Turun Toverit) is a Finnish ice hockey team based at the Kupittaan jäähalli (capacity 2,875, inauguration in November 2006). Established in 1929, TUTO plays in Turku, Finland, and is one of two clubs in that city (the other being TPS of Liiga). The Full name of the club is TUTO Hockey. They play in the second highest ice hockey league in Finland, Mestis, having been relegated out of SM-liiga in 1996 (four years before Liiga closed its promotion/relegation system).

Honours

SM-sarja
 SM-sarja (2): 1968, 1970

Finnish cup
 Finnish Cup (ice hockey) (1): 2017

Mestis
 Mestis (1): 2008
 Mestis (2): 2001, 2018
 Mestis (5): 2005, 2006, 2013, 2014, 2019

Current roster
Updated December 7, 2017

References

External links
 Official Website (in Finnish)

Ice hockey teams in Finland
Former Liiga teams
Mestis teams